The Spread Eagle is a Grade II listed public house at 69–71 Wandsworth High Street, Wandsworth, London.

It was built in the late 19th century, and the architect is not known".

References

Pubs in the London Borough of Wandsworth
Grade II listed buildings in the London Borough of Wandsworth
Grade II listed pubs in London